Kadachit is a Marathi movie released on 25 October 2008. Produced by Ashwini Bhave and directed by Chandrakant Kulkarni.

Cast 
 Ashwini Bhave
 Sachin Khedekar
 Sadashiv Amrapurkar
 Tushar Dalvi
 Sulekha Talwalkar

Soundtrack
The music is provided by Amar Mohile.

References

External links 
 IMDB - imdb.com

2008 films
2000s Marathi-language films
Films directed by Chandrakant Kulkarni